Bronte Moules is a senior career officer with the Australian Department of Foreign Affairs and Trade (DFAT) and Ambassador to Zimbabwe, having previously served as Deputy High Commissioner to Papua New Guinea. Moules also has responsibility for Malawi, the Democratic Republic of the Congo, the Republic of the Congo, and Zambia. She became Ambassador to Myanmar effective January 2011.

Career
Moules earned a Bachelor of Arts degree in 1990 from the Australian National University and a Graduate Diploma in Foreign Affairs and Trade.

AWB oil-for-wheat scandal

Moules played a critical role in uncovering the Australian Wheat Board's (AWB) Iraqi kickbacks scandal. In the early 2000s, Moules was senior member of Australia's delegation to the United Nations in the early 2000s.  During that time, the “AWB was accused of paying kickbacks disguised as trucking fees to the regime of Saddam Hussein in return for wheat contracts.” Moules had been asked to investigate complaints made by Canada about kickbacks.

Human rights
In December 2022, Moules was named as Australia's inaugural Ambassador for Human Rights.

References

Living people
Year of birth missing (living people)
Ambassadors of Australia to Myanmar
Australian women ambassadors
Ambassadors of Australia to Zimbabwe
High Commissioners of Australia to Malawi
High Commissioners of Australia to Zambia
Ambassadors of Australia to the Democratic Republic of the Congo
Ambassadors of Australia to the Republic of the Congo
Australian National University alumni